Myrciaria myrtifolia, commonly known as the ridgetop guavaberry, is a species of plant in the family Myrtaceae. It is endemic to Puerto Rico and it was first described in 1983. It is a shrub found mainly at low elevations, in mountain foothills in the south-east, and coastal plains in the south-west.

References

myrtifolia
Crops originating from the Americas
Tropical fruit
Flora of South America
Endemic flora of Puerto Rico
Fruits originating in South America
Cauliflory
Fruit trees
Berries
Plants described in 1983
Flora without expected TNC conservation status